Keith Dunn(e) may refer to:

Keith Dunn (musician), American harmonica player, singer, producer and songwriter
Keith Dunn (footballer) (1906–1962), Australian rules footballer
Keith Dunne (born 1982), Irish footballer